Kolbec is a community in the Canadian province of Nova Scotia, located in  Cumberland County . Most of the community lies on Route 301.

The community lies on the western bank of River Philip and has a cemetery within its boundaries.

References
 Kolbec on Destination Nova Scotia

Communities in Cumberland County, Nova Scotia
General Service Areas in Nova Scotia